Camp Avoda is a Jewish boys' overnight camp located on Tispaquin Pond in Middleboro, Massachusetts.  It has been in continuous operation since the summer of 1927, making it the oldest Jewish boys' camp in New England.

History 
Camp Avoda was established in early 1927 by an organization then known as the Young Men's Hebrew Association.  The camp was established to serve the needs of  underprivileged Jewish boys.  Originally, the bunks were essentially "huts" and had no screening or walls.  Today the campers sleep in basic cabins which were built at various times between the late 1950s and early 1980s.  Many bunks have had extensions annexed to them after the great rise in attendance in the middle 1990s.

Today the camp is a non-profit entity operated by a Board of Directors and duly incorporated as Camp Avoda, Inc.  It serves the needs of 125-150 campers per session.

Camp Avoda is located on a  tract of land on Tispaquin Pond in Middleborough, Massachusetts.  However, more than half of that land is wooded area which is used for hiking, camping, and a high-elements ropes course which was constructed in 1999.  

The camp is well known for its unique layout.  All 8 cabins, the recreation hall,  the C.I.T. "bungalow", the shower houses, two administrator cabins, and the "OD shack" surround the large ball field, where all field sports are played.  The small size of this camp grants it what many consider a very "intimate" feeling.

Ken Shifman is currently the Executive Director of the Camp, a position Paul Davis has been in since the late 1960s; he has been employed as an administrator since 1966, making him one of the longest serving camp directors in the United States. Camp Avoda has a 7½ week season, which includes a 3½ week long first session and a 4-week second session.  Each summer there are 32-40 junior and senior counselors ranging between ages 17–24.  Almost all counselors were once campers at Camp Avoda, and most are typically college students.

Most campers reside in New England, with the vast majority concentrated in the Greater Boston area.  However, not all campers live near the camp. Each year, a large number of campers travel from states like Florida, New Mexico, New Jersey and California, and from countries as far off as Israel, to spend their summers at Camp Avoda.

Tradition 
Camp Avoda is one of the only summer camps in the world, where any given summer, all or almost all counselors were once Avoda campers and successful graduates of the Avoda Counselor-in-Training (C.I.T.) program.

"Avodians" describe themselves as sharing a "special bond."  Today, Avodians can be found throughout the United States and the World.  In 2002, Camp Avoda celebrated its 75th Anniversary and over 1,000 Avodians throughout the World embarked upon Camp Avoda to revel in the festivities.

4th of July Celebration
July 4 is the first pinnacle event of the summer. The camp hosts its own carnival during the day, where each bunk creates its own booth in addition to those rented by the camp. At night is the annual Bonfire and Chip Ceremony. The bonfire is built entirely by Bunk 14, who name the bonfire and place a sign at the top with the name. The entire camp gathers in front of the bonfire to watch it burn. Once the fire has burned long enough, and has started to die down, the chip ceremony begins. Each bunk chooses a member to stand in front of the fire, and make a speech. After they make their speech, they take a wood chip, and throw it into the fire. The speech usually is about their camp experience, or what camp means to them. Many speeches often revolve around how they believe Avoda is the greatest place on earth, and how the feeling of being there is indescribable. After all the bunks have gone, Bunk 14 goes, with 3 speakers. After Bunk 14 has gone up, all of the old Bunk 14's are called up by year, until you get to the oldest staff members and administrators, and finally the director.

Trips 
Every Thursday, except during Color War, is a trip day.  Trips include Six Flags New England, a Red Sox Game, Water Country, etc.  In addition, there are choice trips, in which campers are given the option to choose which trip they would like to go on (there are usually 3-4 options).  There are also optional trips, which are different from choice trips, in that you can choose not to go on any of them.  Trips designated for specific groups of campers include the annual fishing trip (Freshman, Sophomore, and Juniors), the Bunk 14 overnight, and the Senior Canoe Trip.

Tournaments 
Avoda competes in many tournaments with rival camps including Camps Bauercrest, Bournedale, Young Judaea, Tel Noar, and Tevya. Avoda also attends many tournaments including the Bournedale and YJ tournaments. Avoda also hosts its own tournament. In this tournament the sports are soccer and basketball.

Bunk 14 
Bunk 14, also known as "The Betty Grable Commandos" is the bunk of the oldest campers at Avoda.  Typically it houses 15-year-olds entering the 10th grade.  With Bunk 14 comes special privileges and automatic "alumni" status.  Many alumni are often identified and identify themselves by their Bunk 14 Year.

Color War 
For many staff and campers alike, Color War is the highlight and culmination of the summer. During the last week of the summer, the camp is split up into two teams, "white" and "blue". Each team typically consists of 8 staff members, usually: 1 General, 5 Lieutenants, and 2 Aides. However, in previous years, there have been 4 Lieutenants, 6 Lieutenants, and 3 Aides on a team. Color War takes place over 6 days (sometimes 7, if the "break" takes place in the late afternoon or evening). Each camper is placed in a division with other campers of their own age and one year above or below them.  The four divisions are Freshman, Sophomore, Junior, and Senior.  In each division, the two teams face each other in sports, side events, tug of wars, and other events.  The point values for each event are hidden from the campers, but increase in value from the Freshman to Senior Division.  Before Color War, the staffs assemble to prepare for the week.  A few days before Color War is Negotiations, in which the General and 1st Lieutenant of each team negotiate out the order of picks for each division, as well as team location, and color, with the other team.  A few days after Negotiations, and usually the day before or the day of Color War, is Picks.  During Picks, each team is given the opportunity to pick the campers that they want on their team. One of the traditions of Color War is the silent meals. This doesn't apply to any of the Color War staff members, captains, or judges. If you are caught talking during any of the 18 meals (6 days, 3 meals a day), points will automatically be deducted from your team.  The winner is usually announced through a fixed race or game of some sort, in which the counselors representing the winning team win.  The winning team then proceeds to jump in the lake, celebrating for up to half an hour with their victorious teammates and staff members.

Color War Record

Alumni Association
The Avoda Alumni Association is an active and integral part of Avoda's success.  Since 1987, the Camp Avoda Alumni Association has hosted a full weekend dedicated to Alumni events, which typically takes place the weekend before the campers arrive at camp.  It is common for Alumni members to stop by throughout the summer to interact with the current staff and campers.  While visiting, the alumni members are able to participate in the alumni's which they have (Bunk 1, Bunk 12, Bunk 14).

In addition to the "Alumni Weekend" the Avoda Alumni Association has many events throughout the off-season at various Massachusetts locations, including: Billiard Nights, Family Day at Gillette Stadium, and the annual Thanksgiving Football Game in Cleveland Circle.  The Alumni Association engages in many fundraising and charitable endeavors aimed at providing scholarships to campers for the summers.

References

External links 
 Official Camp Avoda Website

Avoda
Youth organizations based in Massachusetts
1927 establishments in Massachusetts
Buildings and structures in Plymouth County, Massachusetts
Middleborough, Massachusetts
Youth organizations established in 1927